The Gardens is an inner suburb of the city of Darwin, Northern Territory, Australia.

History
The suburb's name derives from the George Brown Darwin Botanic Gardens (named after the former Lord Mayor of Darwin who was formerly the gardens' curator) which began with the appointment of Maurice Holtze in 1878 and has grown to have one of the largest known collections of palms. Holtze used the Gardens area to investigate the possibility of growing sugar cane and cotton in the Territory.

A small residential area adjacent to the Botanical Gardens was called Palmerston Gardens in 1968, but to avoid confusion with the 'new' Palmerston, the Palmerston appellation was discarded in 1984 when the suburb was officially named.

References

External links
 
 https://web.archive.org/web/20080123190745/http://www.nt.gov.au/lands/lis/placenames/origins/greaterdarwin.shtml#t

Suburbs of Darwin, Northern Territory
1878 establishments in Australia